The Huntin', Fishin' and Lovin' Every Day Tour was the fifth headlining concert tour by American country music artist Luke Bryan. It began on May 5, 2017, in Nashville Tennessee, and concluded on October 28, 2017, in San Bernardino, California.

Background
Bryan announced tour in January 2017, by posting a video of him playing Duck Hunt. He sits down on his couch wearing camouflage and says "let's hunt us up some opening acts." Whenever he would shoot at a duck, he would call out a potential opening act. For the ducks he would hit, it would show the face of the opening act who will be going on tour with him. In pixel, the end shot of the video shows the tour name and pictures of Bryan and his opening acts.

Show
Bryan opens the show with "Move" and past hits, "That's My Kind of Night" and "Kick the Dust Up". When it comes time for "Fast", the audience is treated to photos of Bryan's family that are shown on screen. Some of them are from Bryan's wedding to his wife Caroline. Bryan begins and ends "Fast" with just himself and his guitar. At one point of the show Bryan and his band moves to b-stage for the intimate portion of the concert. There he begins to play the piano. At the b-stage Bryan cover's Alabama's "Mountain Music" and Neil Diamond's "Sweet Caroline", then follows up with his slowed down hit "Strip It Down". In Nashville Little Big Town's Kimberly Fairchild made a special appearance to perform her and Bryan's single, "Home Alone Tonight". Afterwards they sung Little Big Town's hit single "Girl Crush" together. Bryan ends the night with "I Don't Want This Night" and "Country Girl (Shake It for Me)".

Opening acts

Lauren Alaina
Craig Campbell
Adam Craig
Brett Eldredge
Seth Ennis
Granger Smith

Setlist
The setlist at the opening Nashville show:
"Move
"That's My Kind of Night"
"Kick the Dust Up"
"Rain Is a Good Thing"
"Fast"
"Crash My Party"
"Kiss Tomorrow Goodbye"
"I See You"
"Roller Coaster"
"All My Friends Say"
"Mountain Music" 
"Caroline" 
"Strip It Down"
"Drink a Beer"
"Home Alone Tonight" 
"Girl Crush" 
"Huntin', Fishin' and Lovin' Every Day"
"I Don't Want This Night to End"
"Country Girl (Shake It for Me)"

Tour dates

References

2017 concert tours
Luke Bryan concert tours